Souselas is a former civil parish in the municipality of Coimbra, Portugal. The population in 2011 was 3,092, in an area of 14.94 km2. On 28 January 2013 it merged with Botão to form Souselas e Botão. It has the largest of three Cimpor factories in Portugal (the other ones being located in Alhandra, São João dos Montes e Calhandriz and Loulé).

References 

Former parishes of Coimbra